The Kurrichane thrush (Turdus libonyana) is a species of bird in the thrush family Turdidae. The species is found from central through to southern Africa. Its natural habitat is dry savanna and woodland, predominantly miombo woodland.

Taxonomy and etymology
The Kurrichane thrush was described in 1836 by the zoologist Andrew Smith, on the basis of a specimen collected in the Transvaal in South Africa. It was originally assigned to the defunct genus Merula. The species is a sister species to the Comoro thrush.

The specific epithet of the Kurrichane thrush, libonyana, is derived from the Tswana name for the red-billed buffalo weaver, Lebonyana.  It was given by mistake to this species, possibly because it also has a reddish bill. Its common name is derived from a corruption of Kaditshwene (rendered as 'Kurrichane'), a former town in northern South Africa where the original specimen was collected.

Distribution and habitat
It is found in Angola, Botswana, Burundi, Democratic Republic of the Congo, Eswatini, Lesotho, Malawi, Mozambique, Namibia, South Africa, Tanzania, Zambia, and Zimbabwe.

Description
The head, upperparts and breast are grey, and the belly is whitish with orange flanks. The throat is white with black streaks on the side. The bill is orange, tending to a paler yellow at the base. The legs tend to vary in colour. Both sexes are alike.

References

External links
 Kurrichane thrush - Species text in The Atlas of Southern African Birds.

Kurrichane thrush
Birds of Southern Africa
Kurrichane thrush
Taxonomy articles created by Polbot